The borough of Reigate and Banstead, one of 11 local government districts in the English county of Surrey, has more than 80 current and former places of worship.  There are 70 places of worship in active use and a further 13 at which religious services are no longer held but which survive in alternative uses.

The majority of residents are Christian, according to the results of the United Kingdom's most recent census, and most places of worship in the borough serve Christian denominations—although three mosques have opened since 1978 and the Subud and Kosmon movements have also established worship centres.  The Church of England, the country's Established Church, has nearly 30 congregations; there are six Roman Catholic churches; and several congregations of Methodists, Baptists, Evangelicals, Open Brethren and the United Reformed Church each have their own church or chapel.  The Plymouth Brethren Christian Church have a major regional meeting hall at Horley and several smaller meeting rooms in the surrounding area.

English Heritage has awarded listed status to 11 places of worship in the borough of Reigate and Banstead.  A building is defined as "listed" when it is placed on a statutory register of buildings of "special architectural or historic interest" in accordance with the Planning (Listed Buildings and Conservation Areas) Act 1990.  The Department for Culture, Media and Sport, a Government department, is responsible for this; English Heritage, a non-departmental public body, acts as an agency of the department to administer the process and advise the department on relevant issues.  There are three grades of listing status. Grade I, the highest, is defined as being of "exceptional interest"; Grade II* is used for "particularly important buildings of more than special interest"; and Grade II, the lowest, is used for buildings of "special interest".  As of February 2001, there were 5 Grade I-listed buildings, 18 with Grade II* status and 388 Grade II-listed buildings in the district.  The borough council also maintains a list of locally listed buildings, of which there are 526  (including 12 places of worship).  Such buildings are of "local architectural or historic interest", often characterised by "good design, traditional materials and ... historic fabric" and in many cases are situated in conservation areas.

Overview of the borough

Reigate and Banstead is one of 11 local government areas in Surrey, an inland county in southeast England immediately south of London. This makes it Surrey's most populous local authority, and it was also the fastest growing between 2001 and 2009. Clockwise from the north, it shares borders with the London boroughs of Sutton and Croydon, the district of Tandridge in Surrey, the borough of Crawley of West Sussex, and the Surrey local authorities of Mole Valley District and Epsom and Ewell Borough.

The borough is mostly urban or suburban in nature and has four main towns: Horley in the south, Redhill and neighbouring Reigate in the centre, and Banstead in the northwest.  About two-thirds of the borough's residents live in these places.  Reigate (originally known as Cherchefelle) has ancient origins, but Horley and Redhill are Victorian railway towns and the downland village of Banstead grew with the outward expansion of Greater London, which adjoins the borough's northern edge.  Of the larger villages, Merstham's ancient origins are still visible, but it became a centre for quarrying in the 18th and 19th centuries and a major housing estate was built in the 1950s. Kingswood is characterised by "leafy suburban surroundings", while Tadworth saw much interwar and postwar housing growth.  Nearby Walton-on-the-Hill remains a "pleasant Victorian village" with a church, chapel, village green and pond—and a manor house which has in its grounds a church and spiritual sanctuary belonging to the Kosmon movement.

Eight ancient parish churches survive in the district. The "curious and puzzling plan" shows evidence of gradual growth over several centuries since its 12th-century origin. The layout of All Saints Church at Banstead "suggest[s] a possible pre-Conquest origin", but most of the work is 13th-century. Lord of the Manor John de Walton founded Walton-on-the-Hill's parish church in the early 13th century, but most of the fabric is two centuries newer. A church has stood by the River Mole at Horley since the 12th century, but the original (presumably timber) building was replaced by the present St Bartholomew's Church in the 14th century. Chipstead's parish church is 12th- and 13th-century, and Merstham's ancient church ("strangely isolated" in relation to the modern settlement) is a 12th-century replacement for an older building. Gatton—a tiny hamlet dominated by the Gatton Park estate, and for many years a famous rotten borough—was recorded in the Domesday survey of 1086 as having a church, and some old fabric remains. Many of these churches were restored or greatly altered in Victorian times; and the eighth ancient church, St Peter's at Woodmansterne (which was recorded in the Domesday survey), was completely rebuilt in 1876 and no earlier work survives.

Restoration work was not the only theme of the 19th century. The growth of the main towns in the Victorian era and into the 20th century prompted the building of many more Anglican churches.  In Reigate, St Mark (1860) and St Luke (1871) supplemented the old parish church, and St Philip (1863) was built a chapel of ease to St Mark. Redhill could no longer rely on Reigate's churches as the opening of the railway transformed it from "a country common into one of the most important towns in Surrey", so St John the Evangelist (1843), St Matthew (1866) and Holy Trinity (1906) were provided. A church once existed in Burgh Heath in Banstead parish, but as early as 1725 "no service [had] been held there within living memory" and the last traces of it disappeared in the late 19th century. A replacement dedicated to St Mary was built in 1908–09. Kingswood was originally a liberty and an exclave of Ewell parish; churches were built in the village (St Andrew, 1848–52) and at Lower Kingswood (originally dedicated to St Sophia, then to Jesus Christ the Wisdom of God). The latter, opened as a mission church in 1891 by Cosmo Bonsor, is a remarkable Byzantine-style building decorated with many types of marble and with remains taken from ancient sites in the Near and Middle East. Among these are capitals retrieved from such places as the northern quarter of Ephesus and the Monastery of Stoudios, St Mary's Church at Blachernae, the Palace of Blachernae, the Church of the Pantocrator and another church which is now the Eski Imaret Mosque, all in Constantinople. More modest Anglican churches were provided in the early 20th century at Tadworth (originally in Kingswood parish) in 1912 and Nork (1930), and in the Victorian era at Sidlow (1861) and South Merstham (1898). The last named church was destroyed by a World War II bomb and had to be rebuilt; designed by E.F. Starling and opened in 1951, the new building may have been the first postwar church built for the Diocese of Southwark. Nearby, the Church of the Epiphany was founded in 1955 on a housing estate built by London County Council near Merstham railway station, and in the same year St Peter's Church was built to serve housing development south of Reigate town centre. (Both of the 1955 churches closed within 60 years: St Peter's went out of use in 2008, and the Diocese of Southwark closed the Church of the Epiphany in January 2015 and revoked its marriage licence with effect from 30 April that year.) Horley's rapid postwar growth also necessitated the opening of two churches to supplement St Bartholomew's: St Francis and St Wilfrid date from 1958 and 1970 respectively; and at Salfords, a residential area north of Horley, a church was completed in 1967. Two unusual Anglican churches can be found on Reigate Heath: a tin tabernacle opened in 1907, and 27 years earlier the roundhouse of an 18th-century windmill was converted into the Chapel of St Cross (now Reigate Mill Church). English Heritage state that this is "probably the only windmill in England in use as a church".

For many years, Redhill was the only local place of worship for Roman Catholics. The first chapel, built in 1860 and registered in 1862, was superseded by St Joseph's Church in the High Street in 1898. This building was deregistered in 1984 and demolished, and a new church with the same dedication was built in its place. Reigate's Catholic church opened in 1938, but the 1960s saw the denomination's most rapid growth locally. Merstham's church was built in 1958–59 and registered in 1960. At Tadworth, a temporary church also registered in that year was replaced in 1966 by the present St John the Evangelist's Church. A similar thing happened in Horley, where the original Church of the English Martyrs on Ladbroke Road (registered for marriages in 1941) was superseded in 1962 by a new building on Vicarage Lane.  Redhill was also the local centre for Baptist worship of various styles.  Charles Spurgeon helped to found the General Baptist cause there, and a town-centre chapel (1868) was superseded by the present building in 1961.  The Redhill church helped or founded the present Merstham (1897), Earlswood (1909) and Reigate (1995) Baptist churches.  Meanwhile, Strict Baptists have chapels at Station Road in Redhill town centre and Shaw's Corner at the Reigate border.

Primitive and Wesleyan Methodist chapels were numerous in the area by the early 20th century.  The Methodist Statistical Returns published in 1947 recorded the existence of former Primitive Methodist chapels in Redhill (Brighton Road) and Reigate (one in Lesbourne Road and another in the Meadvale area), and chapels of Wesleyan origin in Banstead, Burgh Heath, Earlswood, Horley, Redhill (London Road), Reigate (High Street) and South Merstham.  Congregations of Methodists still meet in Banstead, Horley, Redhill and Reigate, but only the last named still occupy their original chapel (erected in 1884).  Replacement churches were built in Banstead, Horley and Redhill in 1971, 1960 and 1992 respectively.  The chapels at Burgh Heath and South Merstham have closed and are no longer extant, but the two ex-Primitive Methodist chapels in Reigate survive in alternative uses, and Earlswood's ex-Wesleyan chapel was acquired by a Muslim group and converted into the Jamia Masjid Al Mustafa.

Congregations of the United Reformed Church are found in Banstead (established in 1940), Redhill (where the Congregational and Presbyterian causes date from 1860 and 1901 respectively)  and Reigate, where the Victorian chapel on the High Street was replaced by a 1970s building in the South Park suburb.  Brethren groups of various types are also strong in the area.  Some churches now characterised as Evangelical originally had an Open Brethren character, such as Sandcross Church; others such as Lee Street Church, Woodlands Chapel and Shrewsbury Chapel still do.  The Plymouth Brethren Christian Church have a main meeting hall on the edge of Horley, at Whitmore Way; this was registered in 1992, but a meeting room (still extant as a local facility) existed at The Grove by 1963 and two other local meeting rooms exist in Earlswood.

Religious affiliation
According to the United Kingdom Census 2011, 137,835 people lived in the borough of Reigate and Banstead.  Of these, 61.9% identified themselves as Christian, 1.91% were Muslim, 1.36% were Hindu, 0.45% were Buddhist, 0.21% were Jewish, 0.15% were Sikh, 0.35% followed another religion, 26.31% claimed no religious affiliation and 7.35% did not state their religion.  The proportion of Christians was much higher than the 59.38% in England as a whole.  Adherents of Islam, Judaism and Sikhism and Buddhism were much less prevalent in the district than in England overall: in 2011, 5.02% of people in England were Muslim, 0.79% were Sikh, 0.49% were Jewish and 0.45% were Buddhist.  The proportions of people who followed Hinduism and religions not mentioned in the Census were slightly lower than the national figures of 1.52% and 0.43% respectively, and the proportion of people with no religious affiliation was higher than the 24.74% recorded at a national level.

Administration

Anglican churches
Administratively, Reigate and Banstead borough is split between two Church of England dioceses: the Anglican Diocese of Southwark, the seat of which is Southwark Cathedral in London, and the Diocese of Guildford, whose cathedral is at Guildford in Surrey.  Five churches are part of the Diocese of Guildford's Epsom Deanery, one of six deaneries in the Archdeaconry of Dorking: these are the churches at Banstead, Burgh Heath, Nork, Tattenham Corner and Walton-on-the-Hill.  The Diocese of Southwark's Reigate Deanery, part of the Reigate Archdeaconry and the Croydon Episcopal Area, covers the six churches in Reigate, three each in Horley, Merstham and Redhill, and those at Chipstead, Gatton, Kingswood, Lower Kingswood, Salfords, Sidlow, Tadworth and Woodmansterne.

Roman Catholic churches
The borough's five Roman Catholic churches are administered by the Roman Catholic Diocese of Arundel and Brighton, whose cathedral is at Arundel in West Sussex.  The churches at Merstham, Redhill and Reigate—which together form the three-church Parish of the Nativity of the Lord—are part of the Redhill Deanery, one of 13 deaneries in the diocese.  Banstead and Tadworth's churches are in the Epsom Deanery.

Other denominations
Earlswood, Horley, Merstham, Redhill and Reigate Baptist Churches are within the Gatwick Network of the South Eastern Baptist Association.  The East Surrey District of the neighbouring London Baptist Association administers Woodmansterne Baptist Church.  The Sutton Methodist Circuit includes two of Reigate and Banstead's Methodist congregations—at Banstead and Tattenham Corner (based at St Mark's United Church, a joint Anglican and Methodist place of worship).  The Redhill & East Grinstead Methodist Circuit covers Horley, Redhill and Reigate's Methodist churches.  The Southern Synod, one of 13 synods of the United Reformed Church in the United Kingdom, administers that denomination's churches at Banstead, Redhill, Reigate and Walton-on-the-Hill.  Lower Kingswood Evangelical Free Church at Lower Kingswood, Merland Rise Church at Tadworth and Tollgate Evangelical Church at South Earlswood are members of two Evangelical groups: the Fellowship of Independent Evangelical Churches (FIEC), a pastoral and administrative network of about 500 churches with an evangelical outlook; and Affinity (formerly the British Evangelical Council), a network of conservative Evangelical congregations throughout Great Britain.  Lee Street Church in Horley is one of 11 churches in the South East region of Partnership UK, a charitable incorporated organisation which acts as a support network for independent and self-governing churches.

Listed status

Current places of worship

Former places of worship

Notes

References

Bibliography

 (Available online in 14 parts; Guide to abbreviations on page 6)

External links 
 St Mary's Church, Reigate

Reigate and Banstead
Reigate and Banstead
Reigate and Banstead
Churches
Reigate and Banstead, churches